The Rolex Tower is a 59-floor tower in Dubai, United Arab Emirates.  The tower has a total structural height of 235 m (771 ft). Construction of the Rolex Tower was completed in 2010; the tower's inauguration was 7 November 2010.  The building encompasses both residential and commercial space and is owned by Ahmed Seddiqi and Sons.

See also
 List of tallest buildings in Dubai
 List of tallest buildings in the United Arab Emirates

External links
 Emporis
 SOM.com project page

References

Residential skyscrapers in Dubai
Office buildings completed in 2010
Residential buildings completed in 2010
Skidmore, Owings & Merrill buildings
Skyscraper office buildings in Dubai
Rolex